The Lesbian Sex Mafia (LSM) is an information and support group for bisexual women and lesbians interested in sexual activities involving BDSM, fetishes, costumes, etc. Founded in 1981 by Jo Arnone and Dorothy Allison, it is located in New York City.

The LSM works "to organize for [women's] sexual desire as strongly as we have tried to organize for our sexual defense". The name was deliberately chosen "in the same spirit of humor as the Ladies Sewing Circle and Terrorism Society."

History
The LSM organized a "Speakout on Politically Incorrect Sex" rally at the 1982 Barnard Conference on Sexuality.  The group was also a subject of a documentary by the German filmmaker Monika Treut, Bondage, the first of four films in the Female Misbehaviour series.

In 1993, Pride Night by LSM, The Eulenspiegel Society, Excelsior MC, GMS/MA, and NLA: Metro New York received the Large Event of the Year award as part of the Pantheon of Leather Awards.

In 1996 LSM cofounder Jo Arnone received the National Leather Association International’s Jan Lyon Award for Regional or Local Work, in 2005 she received the Lifetime Achievement Award as part of the Pantheon of Leather Awards, and in 2010 she received the Mr. Marcus Hernandez Lifetime Achievement Award (Woman) as part of the Pantheon of Leather Awards.

Membership 

Membership in LSM is open to women 18 years and older, including intersex or transgender women, and transgender men who were assigned female. To become a member, one must fill out the application and then becomes an LSM Pledge. Next, the pledge must attend an LSM Orientation/Safety Procedure Meeting.

See also 
 Dorothy Allison
 Patrick Califia
 V.M. Johnson
 Feminist sex wars

References

External links
 
 Lesbian Sex Mafia Speakout, 1982

Feminism and BDSM
Feminism in New York City
Feminist organizations in the United States
Lesbian culture in New York (state)
LGBT organizations based in New York City
Lesbian BDSM
BDSM organizations
Lesbian organizations in the United States
Sex-positive feminism
1981 establishments in New York City